Jantien "Tineke" Johanna Alida Hidding (born 28 July 1959) is a retired Dutch heptathlete. She competed at the 1984 and 1988 Olympics and finished in seventh place in 1984.

Her personal best score was 6176 points, achieved in May 1988 in Eindhoven. Her personal best in the long jump was 6.61 metres, achieved in July 1988 in Roosendaal.

Between 1978 and 1990 Hidding won 14 outdoor and 15 indoor national titles.

Achievements

References

1959 births
Living people
Dutch heptathletes
Dutch female long jumpers
Athletes (track and field) at the 1984 Summer Olympics
Athletes (track and field) at the 1988 Summer Olympics
Olympic athletes of the Netherlands
Sportspeople from Deventer
World Athletics Championships athletes for the Netherlands
20th-century Dutch women
21st-century Dutch women